Elections were held in the colony of South Australia from 15 April to 6 May 1893. All 54 seats in the South Australian House of Assembly were up for election.

Following the 1890 election, the Cockburn government lost a no-confidence motion moved by Thomas Playford II, who formed a government which lasted nearly two years. He was replaced by an equally progressive leader in Frederick Holder, but his ministry was defeated by the very conservative John Downer, who took the parliament into the election.

The incumbent conservative government led by Premier of South Australia John Downer was defeated by the liberal opposition led by Charles Kingston, with the support of the United Labor Party (ULP) led by John McPherson who formed an informal coalition. Each district elected multiple members, with voters casting multiple votes. This was the first election in which parties and increasingly solid groupings were formed.

Background
A United Trades and Labor Council meeting with the purpose of creating an elections committee was convened on 12 December 1890, and held on 7 January 1891. The elections committee was formed, officially named the United Labor Party of South Australia with McPherson the founding secretary. Later that year, the ULP enjoyed immediate success, electing David Charleston, Robert Guthrie and Andrew Kirkpatrick to the South Australian Legislative Council. A week later, Richard Hooper won the 1891 Wallaroo by-election as an Independent Labor member in the South Australian House of Assembly. McPherson won the 1892 East Adelaide by-election on 23 January, becoming the first official Labor leader and member of the House of Assembly. At the 1893 election, ten Labor candidates including McPherson and Hooper were elected to the 54-member House of Assembly which gave the ULP the balance of power. So successful, a decade later at the 1905 election, Thomas Price would form the world's first stable Labor government. John Verran led Labor to form the state's first of many majority governments at the 1910 election.

In response to the ULP, the second party in South Australia formed − the National Defence League (NDL), created by the conservative forces in the colony, and this sharpened the existing conflict with the more 'radical groups'. It also reflected a trend for the conservative members to gravitate to the NDL, and the progressive members to support Kingston, a strong advocate of progressive social policy and reform of the Legislative Council. One issue which was increasingly dividing the Kingston liberal group and the NDL was the restrictive franchise for the Legislative Council. By the 1893 election, both the ULP and NDL had built up impressive electoral organisations. There was no "Liberal" or "Kingston" party, but there was a relatively cohesive Kingston group among both independent members and candidates. The Liberal and Democratic Union would not be formed until the 1906 election.

Results



See also
Members of the South Australian House of Assembly, 1893–1896
Members of the South Australian Legislative Council, 1894–1897

Notes

References
History of South Australian elections 1857-2006, volume 1: ECSA
Statistical Record of the Legislature 1836-2007: SA Parliament
State and federal election results in Australia since 1890

External links
1893 election platform of the United Labor Party: Sound of Trumpets by Jim Moss

Elections in South Australia
1893 elections in Australia
1890s in South Australia
April 1893 events